Central is a Purple Line station of the Chicago Transit Authority 'L' system.  Located at 1024 Central Street in Evanston, Illinois (directional coordinates 2600 north, 1000 west), the elevated platform sits above Central Street, half a block west of Ridge Avenue. The station itself, a Beaux-Arts structure designed by noted transit architect Arthur Gerber, is on the south side of Central Street and is entered at street level, with an auxiliary exit on the north side of the street.

History

Structure
The station was built close by to landmarks that include the Evanston Hospital and offices of NorthShore University HealthSystem, an Evanston fire station, Canal Shores Golf Course, and Chandler Newburger Recreation Center.  Ryan Field, home of the Northwestern University Wildcats football team, and Welsh-Ryan Arena, home of Northwestern's basketball team, are a few blocks west of the station.  Just west of Ryan Field on the north side of the street is the locally famous hot dog stand, Mustard's Last Stand. A few blocks further west is the Central Street station on Metra's Union Pacific/North Line. Less than a mile separate the two rail stations.

Former service

Central was served by trains of the Chicago North Shore and Milwaukee Railroad on the Shore Line Route.  Like Foster and Noyes, Central had an additional side platform to the west of the southbound track for exclusive use of the North Shore Line, to prevent disembarking customers from transferring to 'L' trains for free.  The platform was removed sometime after the North Shore Line ceased operations over this section of the rapid transit system in 1955, but its concrete footings can still be seen opposite the current platform south of Central Street.

Bus connections
CTA
  201 Central/Ridge (Monday-Saturday only)

Notes and references

Notes

References

External links

 Central Street (Evanston Line) Station Page at Chicago-'L'.org
 After Midnight, Central Street Neighbors Association (image of Central Street "L")

Central Street Station Page CTA official site
Central Street entrance from Google Maps Street View

CTA Purple Line stations
Railway stations in Evanston, Illinois
Railway stations in the United States opened in 1908
Former North Shore Line stations
1908 establishments in Illinois